Crane is a British black and white adventure series that aired on ITV from 1963 to 1965. It was shown on Monday nights at 8 PM.

Plot

The series was based around Richard Crane (Patrick Allen) who was a successful city businessman who was tired of the big city rat race. He took his money and retired to the sun-drenched shores of Morocco, near Casablanca, investing his money in a beach side café and boat.

Having let it be known that his services were available for import and export assignments, he soon found himself involved in minor smuggling activities (tobacco and alcohol, but no drugs, although the series never explained how he made a profit smuggling in a country where cigarettes over the counter are already a minimal fraction of the usual price elsewhere and Casablanca is over 300 km from the nearest border by sea). However, this brought him to the attention of the local chief of police, Colonel Mahmoud (Gerald Flood). The pair developed a healthy respect for each other and there were times when they would join forces against a common enemy. Colonel Mahmoud was assisted by Inspector Larbi played by Bruce Montague.

Crane's only real friend was an ex-Foreign Legionnaire named Orlando O'Connor (Sam Kydd), who became his trusted confidant. The glamour in the show was Halima (Laya Raki), a young Arab girl Crane employed to run the bar in his café.

Particularities

The location filming was shot in Morocco, whilst the interior filming was studio-bound and filmed in the studios at Wembley in London.

The series was originally planned as a 'midsummer filler programme', only to last one season of 13 episodes, but it proved so popular that it returned for a second season of 13 episodes and even a third one of 13 episodes.

It spawned another series, this one aimed at children and called Orlando, based on one of its characters. This ran for 76 episodes of 30 minutes, running from 1965 to 1968 (one show ended January 1965, the other started April 1965).
Orlando stars Sam Kydd.

Episodes

Series 1 (2 April to 25 June 1963) 

1. A Death of No Importance. When a friend of Crane's is killed, he hunts the man through the streets of Casablanca. Michael Robbins as Jennings, Jennifer Browne as Margot, Guy Deghy as Primo, Gábor Baraker, James Bree.
 
2. Bad Company. Crane and Orlando pick up a young hitch-hiker and find themselves in trouble. Katherine Blake as Sonia, Charles Tingwell as Albert Ringwood, Desmond Jordan as Inspector Slimene, David Nettheim as Chavez.

3. The Cannabis Syndicate. Crane and Mahmoud work together to stop a murder for sale syndicate which wants them both dead. Peter Reynolds as Austin Crispin, Derek Benfield as Osman, David Graham as Sharif Mohammed, John Herrington as the doctor, Nicholas Evans as the servant.

4. My Deadly Friend. Someone is trying to get Crane arrested on false charges. Bruce Montague as Inspector Larki, Anthony Steele as Gil, Thalia Kouri as Rosamaria, Richard Davies as Willie Jones, Geoffrey Colville as Aubrey Feltham, Arnold Yarrow as Louis Barreto, Henry Lincoln as Arab guide.

5. The Executioners. Crane and Orlando are put in danger after helping a wounded man, being hunted in Casablanca. Alexander Davion as David, Warren Mitchell as Dorfmann, Bryan Woolfe as Malachi, Cyril Shaps as Rabbi, Sydney Arnold, Barbara Bermel, Gordon Rollings, Eileen Way.

6. Yesterday's Woman. Someone is trying to kill Madeleine and blame an innocent man for the crime. Madi Hedd as Madeleine, Donald Morley as Latour, Rex Garner as Sergeant Fazil, Terry Bale as 1st Policeman, Louis Raynes as 2nd Policeman.

7. The Price of Friendship. Crane and Mahmoud are looking for a gang of thieves in Casablanca, one of whom may be a dangerous killer. Dermot Walsh as Haufmann, Sally Nesbitt as Jacqueline, Desmond Newling as Roberts, Edmund Bailey as Fatim.

8. Three Days To Die. Crane believes a murder convict is innocent but only has three days before he is executed. Peter Bowles as Nikkolai, Reginald Barratt as Inspector Misrai, Margot Van der Burgh as Maitre Zem, Brian Cant as Kramm, Gertan Klauber as Habbas, Michael Peake as Brun.

9. My Brother's Keeper. Mahmoud is trying to find a callous murderer in Casablanca, but the Foreign Legion will reveal nothing, so he seeks Crane's help. Barry Keegan as Szabo, Alec Mango as Dr. Ahbib, Richard Marner as Alexis, Maitland Moss as a priest.

10. The Unwanted. An orphan taken in by Crane puts him and his friends' lives in danger. Peter Newton as Abba, Steve Plytas as Krasses, John Hollis as Hamid.

11. Return Of A Hero. Crane rescues a pursued man and comes up with a mystery involving a yellow rabbit. Edgar Wreford as Matthews, John Rumney as Mickey the Crook, Arthur Hewlett as the Colonel.

12. The Golden Attraction. A corpse is discovered in a newly dug grave and Crane is dragged into the matter against his will. Jacqueline Ellis as Alison Harrington, Alan Tilvern as Paul Harrington, Peter Arne as Michael Harrington, Nicholas Evans as boy.

13. A Case Of Dolls. Crane and Orlando find a crate floating in the sea which brings them to the attention of some very nasty men. John Barnett, John Bennett as Smith, George Coulouris as Dr. Jackson, Alec Mango as Chatterji, Dallas Cavell as Customs official.

Series 2 (13 January to 15 June 1964) 

1. The Death Of Mary Vetier. A beautiful woman brings murder and treachery into Crane's life. Patricia Haines as Marie, Peter Vaughan as Goddard, Gertan Klauber as Darius, Michael Hawkins as Martin.

2. Epitaph For A Fat Woman. A friend's son fails to arrive home from school so Crane follows the trail to death and heartbreak for his friends. Ingrid Hafner as Selina, William Marlowe as Pasquale, Emrys James as Grant, David Nettheim, James Culliford, David Graham.

3. Dead Reckoning. Crane reluctantly agrees to help get a man out of prison only to nearly get killed in the attempt. Richard Vernon as Wolsey, Colin Gordon as Lung, Jan Waters as Liz, Richard Davies as Willie Jones, Sheila Keith as Mrs. Ambrose, Bartlett Mullins as Governor, Brian Cant as Man.

4. Picture Of My Brother. Mahmoud seeks Crane's help in bringing the murderous Venza gang to justice. Louis Rayner as Abdul, Bill Nagy as Venza, Jennifer White as Jasmina.

5. Two Rings For Danger. Crane is suspected by the brother and Mahmoud when it turns out he was the last person to see a murdered man alive. Dudley Foster as Charles, Annette Andre as Petra, Job Stewart as Alphonse, Sydney Bromley as Slotz, Julian Sherrier as Dr. Sul.

6. Death Is A Black Camel. Mahmoud must solve a baffling case while Crane has to keep a rendezvous from which he may not return. Philip Latham as Salbierre, Ric Hutton as Vanel, Lee Richardson as Corto, Patrick Godfrey as Dr. Launay, Reg Lye as Stanley, Gábor Baraker as Fat policeman.

7. The Secret Assassin. Crane is invited to Ahmed's Palace as an honoured guest but gets a reception which makes him doubt Ahmed. Cyril Luckham as Mouley Ahmed, Isobel Black as Zuida, Donald Bisset as Muller.

8. A Mouthful Of Ashes. Crane gives Orlando a ticket to the theatre, with no idea that he is sending him into danger, in which he too will become involved. Anthony Newlands as Stark, Maxine Audley as Freda, Arthur White as Pirelli.

9. Recoil. Crane and Orlando accept a Contessa's invitation to go to her villa, not knowing that Crane's murder is planned. Patricia Kneale as Contessa d'Avezzano, Paul Eddington as Dr. Stampini, Richard Hurndall as Fausto.

10. Gypsy's Warning. Philipe plans revenge on a police informer and the cards of a gypsy lead Crane into violence and murder. John Woodvine as Philipe, Howard Goorney as a Gypsy, Harold Innocent as Jacko.

11. Knife In The Dark. Orlando is found on the beach with blood on his hands and is suspected of murder after a quarrel the night before. Derek Sydney as Arif, Michael Mellinger as Abdoul, Zooey Zephyr as Mokahl, Stephanie Bidmead as Annette Brillon, John G. Heller as Bartender.

12. Murder Is Waiting. Crane is after a killer hidden in Casablanca and receives an invitation which leads him into danger. Keith Anderson as Sweeper, Basil Dignam as Raswani, David Andrews as Marcel, Harry Landis as Ben Zeda, Roger Delgado as Barman, Irene Prador as Mrs. Kirschbaum.

13. Man Without A Past. A gang of thieves try to murder Crane to stop him clearing an innocent man. Patrick Troughton as Hugo Krantz, Alan Wheatley as Michaud, Anthony Baird as Sergeant Miraz, Royston Tickner as Sgt. Khatib, Joby Blanshard as Rahman, Hal Dyer as Hostess, Michael Allaby as Doctor.

Series 3 (26 October 1964 to 25 January 1965) 

1. Death Is A Closed Door. Crane has to turn down a friend who is trying to save a threatened man. Sandor Elès as Shafik, Valarie Sarruf as Zena, Camilla Hasse as Raya, Russell Waters as Doctor, Eric Francis as Undertaker, Jeffrey Isaac as Policeman.

2. T.N.T. Men unskilled in the use of explosives put Crane's life in danger. Edwin Richfield as Steve Hanna, Delphi Lawrence as Lisa Martes, Barry Linehan as Harvey Troop, Henry Lincoln as Mogista.

3. The Third Bullet. A telephone call from an unknown woman puts Crane's life in danger from an assassin. Leonard Trolley as Shaab, Felix Felton as Major Culcao, Lawrence Hardy as Dr. Salas, Brian Badcoe as Raoul, Peter Halliday as Eladio, Peter Birrel as 1st Guard, Bruce Wightman as 2nd Guard, Margaret Whiting as Tina Mondrego.

4. A Danger To Others. When Julie Lamont disappears, Crane and Orlando are asked to find her. They expect to find her dead but there are surprises in store. Sally Home as Julie Lamont, Eric Pohlmann as Dr. Knunsden, Diana Lambert as Francine, John Bryans as Dr. Mustapha, Michael Godfrey as Perez.

5. Death Walks Beside Me. Johnnie, an old friend asks for Crane's help but the request may be impossible for Crane. John Bonney as Johnnie, Christopher Carlos as Jericho, John Cazabon as Perrichon, Gábor Baraker as Cairo, Reginald Barratt as Public prosecutor, Conrad Monk as Guard.

6. The Man With The Big Feet. A local mystic prophesies that Orlando will die. Crane investigates. Bruno Barnabe as The Master, Campbell Singer as Lewis, Vanda Godsell as Mrs Lewis, Peter Laird as Halima's cousin.

7. In Trust Find Treason. Mahmoud's reputation comes into question so Crane springs to his defence. Ivor Dean as Aldo Romitu, Yolande Turner as Allegria, Robert Cartland as Gadulla.

8. The Painted Lady. Crane chance meeting Louisa reveals a very dangerous lady. Moira Redmond as Louisa, Richard Carpenter as Barjou, Harvey Hall as Otto, George Pravda as Carl Hassler.

9. Moving Target. An old enemy, a military man, seeks Mahmoud's life. Scott Forbes as Major Seaford, John Carson as Hennessey-Bodley, Ursula Howells as Stella.

10. A Cargo Of Cornflower. Offered a job of transporting cornflour, Crane is suspicious when they won't let him inspect the cargo. Then Orlando goes missing. Peter Bowles as Vincent Moro, Edina Ronay as Carmena, Mark Kingston as Flavio, John Hollis as Djiba, David Nettheim as Aziz.

11. A Violent Animal. Crane's smuggling activities has caused a man from the mainland to come to kill him. Peter Dyneley as Peter Garvey, Michael Mellinger as Achmet, Arthur White as Pirelli, Keith Barron as Rene Leclerc, John Cater as Afiz, Arthur Blake as Sgt. Zahaz, Jolyon Booth as Gibbah, Michael Allaby as Policeman.

12. The Death Of Karaloff. Mahmoud has been ordered to keep Karaloff, a known criminal and sworn enemy alive. Denys Graham as Karaloff, Tony Steedman as Brigadier Harris, Robert Gillespie as Ames, Philip Stone as Boris, Aubrey Morris as Mustafa, John Garvin as Doctor.

13. The Man In The Gold Waistcoat. The waistcoat caused Crane to be involved in the death of a man found in the desert and now he's running for his life from a band of men intent on killing him. Steve Plytas as Franz Bauer, Alan Wheatley as Dr. Hilfe, William Devlin as Sheik Gamal, Alan MacNaughtan as The Major, Nicolas Chagrin as Selim.

References

External links

1960s British drama television series
1963 British television series debuts
1965 British television series endings
Black-and-white British television shows
ITV television dramas
English-language television shows
Television shows produced by Associated-Rediffusion